is a Japanese footballer who currently plays for JEF United Chiba as a centre back.

Career

Yokohama F. Marinos
In the Summer of 2015, Akai signed for Yokohama F. Marinos.

Nagoya Grampus
On 8 August 2017, Arai signed for Nagoya Grampus on loan, signing for them permanently on 26 December 2017.

Club statistics

Club

References

External links
Profile at JEF United Chiba

1993 births
Living people
Juntendo University alumni
Association football people from Chiba Prefecture
Japanese footballers
J1 League players
J2 League players
Yokohama F. Marinos players
Nagoya Grampus players
JEF United Chiba players
Association football defenders
Universiade bronze medalists for Japan
Universiade medalists in football